The Costești-Blidaru Dacian fortress was a Dacian fortified town. Located near Costești village, Hunedoara County, Romania, it belongs to the Dacian Fortresses of the Orăștie Mountains World Heritage Site. The fortress was built in the 1st century BC, during Burebista's rule, with the purpose of defending the area against the Romans.

Gallery

External links
Cetățile dacice din Munții Orăștiei - Costești-Blidaru
Virtual reconstruction of the fortress
Cetatea Blidaru

References

Dacian towns
Dacian fortresses of the Orăștie Mountains
Dacian fortresses in Hunedoara County
Historic monuments in Hunedoara County
Tourist attractions in Hunedoara County
Ancient history of Transylvania